Yegoryevsky District is the name of several administrative and municipal districts in Russia:
Yegoryevsky District, Altai Krai, an administrative and municipal district of Altai Krai
Yegoryevsky District, Moscow Oblast, an administrative and municipal district of Moscow Oblast

See also
Yegoryevsky (disambiguation)

References